William Rydelere may refer to:

William Rydelere (fl. 1381–1397), MP for Horsham
William Rydelere (fl. 1393), MP for Horsham